Fu Baolu (23 June 1913 – 8 July 1943) was a Chinese athlete. He competed in the men's pole vault at the 1936 Summer Olympics. He also set several national records in the pole vault. He was killed in a plane crash during a training flight with the Chinese Air Force.

References

External links
 

1913 births
1943 deaths
Athletes (track and field) at the 1936 Summer Olympics
Chinese male pole vaulters
Olympic athletes of China
Place of birth missing